Bojer is a surname. Notable people with the surname include:

 Wenceslas Bojer (1795–1856), Czech naturalist and botanist
 Johan Bojer (1872–1959), Norwegian novelist and dramatist